The 2012 German Figure Skating Championships took place on January 6–7, 2012 in at the Eissportzentrum Oberstdorf in Oberstdorf. Skaters competed in the disciplines of men's singles, ladies' singles, pair skating, and ice dancing on the senior, junior, and novice levels. The results of the national championships were among the criteria used to choose the German teams to the 2012 World Championships and 2012 European Championships.

Medalists

Senior

Junior

Senior results

Men

Ladies

Pairs

Ice dancing

Junior results
The 2011–12 competition for Junior, Jugend, and Nachwuchs levels was held from December 14–18, 2011 in Oberstdorf.

Men

+ 10 competitors

Ladies

+ 36 competitors

Pairs

Ice dancing

+ 7 other couples

External links
 2012 German Championships: Senior results at the Deutsche Eislauf Union
 2012 German Junior Championships: Junior, youth, and novice results at the Deutsche Eislauf Union
 2012 German Championships at the Deutsche Eislauf Union

German Championships
German Figure Skating Championships
Figure Skating Championships